Presidency of Kassym-Jomart Tokayev began on 20 March 2019, when he assumed office shortly after resignation long-time President Nursultan Nazarbayev; as a Senate Chairman, Tokayev became the Presidential Designate in accordance to the Constitution and would serve as an acting head of state. After declaring snap presidential elections Tokayev, endorsed by Nazarbayev, become the candidate for the ruling Nur Otan party and swept 71% of the vote in the race, thus becoming officially the 2nd President of Kazakhstan. After being inaugurated on 12 June 2019, Tokayev pledged to uphold many of the previous policies by Nazarbayev and at the same time, continue and accelerate social and political reforms.

Presidency 
On 9 April 2019, Tokayev announced early elections to be held on 9 June 2019. On 23 April, Tokayev became a candidate for president following his nomination by the Nur Otan party. During the campaign, Tokayev was mocked on social media for his use of photo manipulation software to erase his wrinkles and double chin from official photos. Tokayev was elected president of Kazakhstan on 9 June with 71% of the popular vote. He was congratulated by foreign heads of state such as Xi Jinping, Ilham Aliyev, Recep Tayyip Erdogan, Emomali Rahmon, and Sooronbay Jeenbekov.

Domestic policies

Political reforms 
In May 2020, Tokayev signed the laws “On the procedure for organizing and holding peaceful assemblies in the Republic of Kazakhstan”, “On introducing amendments to the Constitutional Law of the Republic of Kazakhstan“, “On Elections in the Republic of Kazakhstan”, and “On introducing amendments and additions to the Law of the Republic of Kazakhstan “On Political Parties”. The new laws are an important part of the measures to strengthen the state’s democratic foundations, and enhance the role of civil society. In his State of the Nation Address, he emphasised that "Kazakhstan must create a multi-party system to build a modern, effective state", also saying that the ruling Nur Otan party should collaborate more with other parties.

Tokayev advocated political reforms that would promote the concept of a "state that listens" to civil society creating a constructive dialogue. Tokayev initiated the establishment of the new National Council of Public Trust to facilitate this dialogue. He also called for direct elections for the äkıms (local heads) of rural districts, townships, and villages to be held in 2021 to which he signed decree on 14 September 2020 of the implementation of National Plan of Measures which set tasks for the drafting of constitutional amendments that would allow for rural äkım direct elections as well as the development of local government and its functions. After the 2021 legislative elections which saw three of five contesting parties retain their seats in the Mazhilis, Tokayev at the opening 1st Session of the 7th Parliament proposed to reduce the electoral threshold from 7% to 5%, stating it would encourage more registered parties to participate in the future parliamentary elections as well as the vote option "Against all" to be re-included in the ballots once again. As the Parliament ratified Tokayev's proposed constitutional amendments, he signed the laws into place on 25 May 2021.

Abolition of capital punishment 

In December 2019, Tokayev announced that Kazakhstan would join the Second Optional Protocol to the International Covenant on Civil and Political Rights, after the issue was raised by Kazakh human rights activists and experts during discussions at the meetings of the National Council of Public Trust. From there, Tokayev set the task for the Ministry of Foreign Affairs to start the process of joining the Second Optional Protocol which would set measures in abolishing of death penalty in the country.

At the Seventy-fifth session of the United Nations General Assembly, Tokayev spoke to the Assembly, saying that his decision was driven "to fulfill a fundamental right to life and human dignity." Kazakh Representative to the UN Kairat Umarov signed the protocol on 23 September 2020. The Parliament ratified the document on 29 December 2020 and on 2 January 2021, Tokayev signed decree in abolishing death penalty in Kazakhstan. The move received applause from such people as Amnesty International’s Director for Eastern Europe and Central Asia Marie Struthers, telling that "Kazakhstan getting closer to joining the ever-growing community of nations that have left this shameful punishment behind," while International Commission Against the Death Penalty (ICDP) President Navi Pillay called it a "historic international commitment to end the death penalty during peacetime."

Climate change 
Tokayev expressed support for the tackling of climate change, calling it "urgent and existential." At the Climate Ambitions Summit in which was held remotely on 12 December 2020, Tokayev pledged for Kazakhstan to reach carbon neutrality by 2060 with a development and adoption of a long term development strategy to lower emissions and de-carbonisation of the economy. He said that Kazakhstan is "highly vulnerable to climate change as a landlocked and developing state" with a heavy reliant on fossil fuels and proposed for the planting for two billion trees within the country in order increase carbon absorption and curb looming desertification problems.

In May 2021, Tokayev announced the Low-Carbon Development Concept, a national project which seeks to reduce Kazakhstan's dependency on coal by development electric power industry and the country’s energy balance by 2035.

Corruption 

Tokayev described his vision regarding to corruption, calling it a "direct damage to national security" and advocated for the need of accountability for implementation of state programs and the use of budget funds by äkıms. He warned that any crime related to inefficient use or theft of public funds would be severely suppressed and punished. In a government meeting, he expressed his belief that the heads of state agencies should resign in case of corruption crimes of their subordinates, stating that a resignation is a mandatory measure and any objection is "prerogative for the head of state."

In a government meeting, Tokayev expressed his belief that the heads of state agencies should resign in case of corruption crimes of their subordinates, stating that a resignation is a mandatory measure and any objection is "prerogative for the head of state." On 28 November 2019, he signed the "On Amendments and Additions to Certain Legislative Acts of the Republic of Kazakhstan on Civil Service and Anti-Corruption Issues" law into place, which obliged government ministers and äkıms to resign if the top officials within institutions are found guilty of corruption.

In October 2019, Tokayev ordered the Anti-Corruption Agency to intensify its probe into the disappearance of funds during implementation of the project Nur-Sultan Light Metro (LRT), hinting that the city government may have been involved in case in letting certain people involved within the project to flee abroad, referring to the former LRT chief executive Talgat Ardan whom was issued an arrest warrant in July 2019 on the charges of embezzlement. Tokayev in regards pledged for the project to continue, noting that any persons behind the case must be held accountable.

Economy 

In regards to economy, Tokayev spoke in favour for a distribution of national income, calling it "strategically important" for the country. On 17 June 2019, he signed a decree, forming the Ministry of Trade and Integration, appointing Bakhyt Sultanov to the post which would aim to increase exports essential to economic growth and job creation. At the address to the nation, Tokayev called for an increase in the national minimum wage for the first time since 2018 from 42,500 to 60,000 ₸ starting 1 January 2022, citing the global pandemic which caused financial strain and asserted that it would lead to growth in domestic consumption. In terms of wage fund, Tokayev instructed the government to implement soft measures in encouraging businesses to raise salaries for employees by pledging for state-supported benefits.

In an interview to Bloomberg News, Tokayev announced a debt relief "for people who find themselves in very difficult circumstances", telling that his initiative would target 16% of the Kazakhstan's population. At the same time, he called for an end of government bailouts for banks, believing that the state should not be involved with the issue. That same day on 26 June 2019, he signed decree "On measures to reduce the debt burden of citizens of the Republic of Kazakhstan" which instructed the government and the National Bank to start the process of decommissioning unsecured consumer loans.

At the January 2020 government meeting, Tokayev set the task of forming the Centre for Analysis and Monitoring of Socio-Economic Reforms under the Presidential Administration, which would operate on a voluntary basis and later be transformed into a Presidential Reform Agency. At the same time, he called for more enforced registration of cars imported from Eurasian Economic Union (EAEU), noting that auto owners themselves would be required to pay the registration fee and tax despite backlash from several car owners with Kyrgyzstani and Armenian number plates whom protested Tokayev's proposal in several cities.

On 9 March 2020, following the worsening economic situation worldwide as a result of COVID-19 pandemic, Tokayev instructed the government to form an anti-crisis plan which would fulfill "all social obligations". On 17 March, a series of packages were unveiled which aimed at easing burden for private sector by providing cheaper credit, tax incentives, cutting back on audits and promoting employment. As the pandemic progressed, inflation for goods began to grow leading to an increase in social discontent particularly in western Kazakhstan. In response to the problem, Tokayev blamed the government and the central bank for being too "powerless" and from there, urged them to reduce the inflation rate towards 2–4%, noting the surplus amount of the money supply in result of implemented anti-crisis measures.

Education 

At the teacher's conference held in August 2019, Tokayev announced that the average salary for school teachers in Kazakhstan would be increased by double within four years. He also instructed the Ministry of Education and Science to develop and launch special programs to overcome the academic gap of children from low-income families and schools in socially troubled areas, noting the need of overcome educational inequality specially between rural and urban areas.

On 30 December 2019, Tokayev signed the law "On the status of the teacher", an act aimed at supporting the profession of school teachers and enhancing the prestige of teaching.

In the third meeting of the National Council of Public Trust, Tokayev announced that the salary of university professors would too be increased and in an attempt to enhance competitiveness in the country’s higher education system, an average cost of educational grants were also increased.

Environment 

In his inaugural speech, Tokayev called environmental issues "concerning" and proposed a unified policy by adopting a new code which would protect the environment. On 17 June 2019, he signed a decree forming the Ministry of Ecology, Geology and Natural Resources, appointing Magzum Myrzagaliev to the post. The Ministry was given the authority to protect the environment, oversee the rational use of natural resources, geology and reproduction of the mineral and raw materials base, as well as the treatment of solid household waste, water and wastewater, and forestry.

Tokayev addressed the problems regarding the air pollution in Almaty. He instructed the government, city äkımat, and Samruk-Energy to implement final decision in the transformation of the Almaty-2 thermal power station to natural gas in order to limit harmful emissions that come from the plant which is estimated to be 30% of all other sources, warning that any delay would be "absolutely unacceptable."

On 30 September 2021, the Mazhilis voted for the draft law "On ratification of the Protocol on the Protection of the Caspian Sea from Land-based Sources and Activities to the Framework Convention for the Protection of the Marine Environment of the Caspian Sea", which aimed to provide for the adoption of regional and national programs or action plans based on measures to control the pollution as well as to create and maintain a database on the characteristics for the marine environment and coastal areas in a number of pollutant volumes entering the sea. Tokayev signed the law into place on 4 October 2021.

Healthcare 

During the state address to the nation, Tokayev announced that a health insurance mandate would be launched in Kazakhstan starting from 1 January 2020 in order to improve the quality and accessibility of medical services. He also noted that the government would maintain a guaranteed amount of free medical care with more than 2.8 trillion tenge allocated for its financing over the next three years and that an additional of 2.3 trillion ₸ would be spent for the development of healthcare system.

At meeting of the National Council of Public Trust, Tokayev urged ministers to review and decriminalise medical errors, calling it "unfair criminal prosecution." On 7 July 2020, he signed the new code "On public health and healthcare system" and law "On amendments and additions to certain legislative acts on healthcare issues" into place, which strengthened legal protection for medical personnel, introduced a differentiated approach to medical errors, and redefined a citizen’s rights regarding vaccination. The code also restricted the consumption of e-cigarettes and introduced a ban on the import, production and distribution of snus and other non-smoking tobacco products, as well as introduced administrative responsibility for the sale of tobacco products to persons under the age of 21.

Infrastructure 
Tokayev pledged for the government to invest 1.2 trillion tenge for the development of infrastructure until 2022 for Kazakh citizens to have an access for clean drinking water, natural gas and public transport and continue in monitoring the implementation of the Nurly Zhol programme, which was enacted by Nazarbayev. He called for the officials along with the Parliament and Accounts Committee to ensure the efficient use of budget funds.

During a visit to Almaty in May 2020, Tokayev was presented with plans for the reconstruction of the Almaty International Airport which included a new terminal, from there he expressed his desire that the Almaty Airport would become largest aviation hub in Central Asia.

Relationship with Nazarbayev 
Immediately upon taking office, Tokayev proposed renaming the capital city of Kazakhstan after his predecessor, and the same day the Parliament of Kazakhstan approved the renaming of Astana to Nur-Sultan. 

In October 2019, it was announced that all potential ministerial candidates needed the approval of Nazarbayev before being appointed, with the exception of Minister of Defence, Interior Minister and Foreign Minister.

On 2 May 2020, Nazarbayev's daughter Dariga Nazarbayeva was removed from the Senate and her role as the Chair by order of President Tokayev. Many theories arose that this was a sign of either Tokayev was expanding his political influence or a growing feud between the ruling elite.

As former president Nazarbayev resigned from the post as the chairman of the Assembly of People of Kazakhstan (QHA) on 28 April 2021, he proposed Tokayev to succeed him which was supported by the QHA members. Tokayev, in turn, suggested Nazarbayev to be named as the "Honorary Chairman", saying that the status should "rightfully belong" to him due to a "historical merit."  

On January 2, 2022, protests began in Kazakhstan, which turned into mass riots, the reason for which was a sharp increase in the price of liquefied gas. Soon, the protesters moved from economic demands to political ones, including the resignation of the country's leadership. 

On January 5, Tokayev declared a state of emergency throughout Kazakhstan, announced the resignation of the government of Askar Mamin, head of the KNB Karim Massimov, State Secretary Krymbek Kusherbayev and head of the Security Council Nursultan Nazarbayev, whose place was taken by himself. On the 28th of January Tokayev announced his initiative to rename the ruling party from «Nur Otan» (a wordplay of Nazarbayev's first name "NURsultan") to «Amanat».

Since then, Tokayev's presidency was described as "Anti-Nazarbayev". On March 16, 2022, a message was delivered by Tokayev to the people of Kazakhstan, which, according to Kazakh officials, was “the starting point for building a new Kazakhstan”. At it, Tokayev announced the start of a number of political reforms, including strengthening the role of the parliament, the transition to a mixed electoral system, simplifying the procedure for registering a party, increasing the competitiveness of the media, and so on.

In his address to the citizens of Kazakhstan on May 5, Kassym-Jomart Tokayev announced that a nationwide referendum would be held on June 5 to amend the country's constitution. Among the amendments are the previously announced transition “from a super-presidential form of government to a presidential republic with an influential parliament and an accountable government”, the creation of a Constitutional Court, the final abolition of the death penalty, and the exclusion of all mentions of the first president from the constitution. All these changes, according to Tokayev, will contribute to the construction of the "Second Republic", he expressed confidence that the population will support all the proposed amendments.

Foreign policy 
Tokayev pledged continuity of foreign policy initiated by his predecessor Nursultan Nazarbayev. This means the continuation of measures to attract foreign investments, multi-vector foreign policy and ensuring security in the region. During his first month in office, he had met 4 world leaders, 2 of them abroad and the other two in Nur-Sultan.

On 7 April 2021, Tokayev signed decree forming the Special Representative for International Cooperation, claiming that such post would increase attention of Kazakhstan’s leadership to international cooperation concerns in the light of the dynamically changing global and regional agenda. He appointed Erzhan Kazykhanov to the post, whom was instructed to deal with issues of expanding international cooperation in the humanitarian sphere, climate diplomacy, as well as promoting Kazakhstan’s key foreign policy initiatives.

Russia 

According to political analyst Rico Isaacs, the decision in Tokayev replacing Nursultan Nazarbayev was due to his own full will to not rapidly implement democratization reforms, which would hurt Nazarbayev's legacy of stability and relations with Russia. Just two weeks after taking office, Tokayev visited Moscow in his first foreign state visit on 4 April 2019, meeting with Putin alongside other Russian officials. During the visit, Putin offered Russian assistance to Tokayev in the construction of a proposed nuclear power plant in the country. In June 2019, Tokayev ruled out that the decision of constructing a nuclear power plants would be made on decision by local matter, if by means of a referendum. At a meeting with cabinet officials, Tokayev stated that Kazakhstan would not rush with the proposal, although noting that nation shouldn't delay longer with decision. He argued that the entire developed world relies  on nuclear power telling that "phobias are out of place here."

During a visit to Sochi in October 2019, Tokayev in a speech at Valdai Discussion Club praised Russia as a "great state" and that "in the modern world no key problem, be it global or regional, can be solved without the constructive participation of Russia."

In late 2020, Russian lawmakers Vyacheslav Nikonov and Yevgeny Fyodorov made remarks on how the entire Kazakhstani territory was a gift given by the Soviet Union and that was currently being leased by Russia. This sparked backlash from the Kazakh Ministry of Foreign Affairs which warned about severing relations between both nations due to "provocative attacks". In response to controversial statements, Tokayev in response on Egemen Qazaqstan, wrote that such words from "some foreign citizens" are aimed at "spoiling" relations between two states, insisting that "nobody from outside gave Kazakhs this large territory as a gift."

References 

2019 establishments
Tokayev
2010s in Kazakhstan
2020s in Kazakhstan